ČSK Uherský Brod is a Czech football club located in Uherský Brod. It currently plays in the Moravian–Silesian Football League.

In the 1994–95 season, the club played in the Czech 2. Liga, finishing 15th of 18 teams and being relegated in its only season at such a level. While playing in the Czech Fourth Division, the club reached the third round of the 2003–04 Czech Cup before suffering a heavy 8–0 home defeat against FC Tescoma Zlín.

References

External links
  

Football clubs in the Czech Republic
Association football clubs established in 1893
Uherské Hradiště District